The 2018 Yas Marina GP3 Series round was the final showdown of the 2018 GP3 Series. It was held on 24 and 25 November 2018 at Yas Marina Circuit in Abu Dhabi, United Arab Emirates. The race supported the 2018 Abu Dhabi Grand Prix.

Classification

Qualifying

Race 1

Race 2

Notes

References

|- style="text-align:center"
|width="35%"|Previous race:
|width="30%"|GP3 Series2018 season
|width="40%"|Next race:

Yas Marina
GP3
GP3 Yas Marina